Kambaata is a Highland East Cushitic language, part of the larger Afro-Asiatic family and spoken by the Kambaata people.  Dialects are Tembaro, Alaba, and K'abeena The language has many verbal affixes. When these are affixed to verbal roots, there are a large amount of morphophonemic changes. The language has subject–object–verb order. The phonemes of Kambaata include five vowels (which are distinctively long or short), a set of ejectives, a retroflexed implosive, and glottal stop.

The New Testament and some parts of the Old Testament have been translated into the Kambaata language. At first, they were published in the Ethiopian syllabary (New Testament in 1992), but later on, they were republished in Latin letters, in conformity with new policies and practices.

Notes

References 
ALAMU BANTA ATAARA, Kookaata. Kambaatissa–Amaarsa–Ingiliizissa Laaga Doonnuta. ከምባትሳ–ኣማርኛ–እንግሊዝኛ መዝገበ ቃላት. Kambatissa–Amharic–English Dictionary (Addis Abäba: Bǝrhanǝnna sälam mattämiya dǝrǝǧǧǝt, 2009 EC = 2016/2017 CE); 1165 pp.
Korhonen, Elsa, Mirja Saksa, and Ronald J. Sim. 1986. "A dialect study of Kambaata-Hadiyya (Ethiopia) [part 1]."  Afrikanistische Arbeitspapiere 5: 5-41.
Korhonen, Elsa, Mirja Saksa, and Ronald J. Sim. 1986. "A dialect study of Kambaata-Hadiyya (Ethiopia), part 2: Appendices."  Afrikanistische Arbeitspapiere 6: 71-121.
 Sim, Margaret G. 1985. "Kambaata Verb Morphophonemics," The morphophonemics of five Highland East Cushitic languages including Burji. Afrikanistische Arbeitspapiere 2. Köln: Institut für Afrikanistik, Universität zu Köln.  Pages 44–63.
 Sim, Margaret. 1988. "Palatalization and gemination in the Kambaata verb." Journal of Afroasiatic Languages 1.58-65.
 Treis, Yvonne. 2008. A Grammar of Kambaata - Part I: Phonology, Nominal Morphology and Non-verbal Predication. Köln: Rüdiger Köppe Verlag.

External links 
 Treis, Yvonne. 2006. "Form and Function of Case Marking in Kambaata."

Languages of Ethiopia
East Cushitic languages